Marielle Rooimans (born 28 July 1968) is a Dutch former professional tennis player.

She has career-high WTA rankings of 232 in singles, achieved on 30 January 1989, and 235 in doubles, reached on 26 October 1987. Her twin sister Nicolette former tennis players.

She made her WTA Tour main-draw debut at the 1988 Spanish Open.

ITF finals

Singles: 4 (2–2)

Doubles: 3 (2–1)

References

External links 
 

1968 births
Living people
Dutch female tennis players
20th-century Dutch women
20th-century Dutch people
21st-century Dutch women